Jarrod Emick (born July 2, 1969) is an American actor who primarily acts in musicals. He received a Tony Award, a Drama Desk Award, and a Theatre World Award for his performance in the 1994 revival of Damn Yankees.

Biography
Emick grew up in Oral, South Dakota, attended Hot Springs High School in nearby Hot Springs, South Dakota, and later attended South Dakota State University.

Emick's Broadway debut was in Miss Saigon as a replacement for the role of Chris. However, it was his next role, in Damn Yankees, that won him acclaim—a Tony for Best Featured Actor in a Musical, a Drama Desk Award for Outstanding Supporting Actor, and a Theatre World Award.

Subsequent roles included Brad Majors in The Rocky Horror Show, Greg Connell in The Boy From Oz, and a role in the musical Ring of Fire.

Apart from theatre, Emick appeared in the 1996 TV movie Andersonville.

In 2005, he played the role of F. Scott Fitzgerald in Frank Wildhorn's Waiting For The Moon, opposite Lauren Kennedy.

He was seen playing Michael Wiley in Contact at the North Shore Music Theatre.

Emick played the roles of the Doctors in Next to Normal at the Milwaukee Repertory Theater through January 2012.

Emick played the role of Tick/Mitzi in Priscilla, Queen of the Desert at the Ogunquit Playhouse from August 10 to September 3, 2016.

As of 2019, Emick lives in Las Vegas with his wife and two sons.

Awards and nominations

References

External links
 
 

1969 births
Living people
Male actors from South Dakota
American male musical theatre actors
Drama Desk Award winners
Tony Award winners
People from Fall River County, South Dakota